Silvia Vaculíková (born 22 July 1967) is Slovak photographer and traveler. She mainly photographs simple people in their natural environment, recording local customs, religion and culture. Her photos, won her many awards.

Life
Vaculíková was born in Trnava. She is the great-granddaughter of the inventor of the parachute, Štefan Banič, and the granddaughter of the discoverer of the Driny cave in Smolenice. After finishing her studies, she worked in a travel agency and subsequently founded her own travel agency focusing on destinations. She lives and works in Bratislava and has traveled through five continents, visiting ninety-seven countries.

Publications
The World of People. 2007.
Customs. 2009.
Travelling the World. 2013.
The World on a Palm. 2016.

Awards
 2 awards at the International Photography Exhibition, The History of Mankind in Beijing, China under the auspices of the UNESCO in 2000
 A medal of the AFOCER show- Cerdanyola del Valles – Spain, at the AQÜADUCTE 2000 competition, under the auspices of FIAP
 Honorable mention of FIAP for a set of photographs – STROM 2000 – Ružomberok
 2nd prize at the Competition and Exhibition of Artistic Photography 2001 organized by the Association of Slovak Photographers – Ružomberok
 Honorable mention of FIAP for a set of photographs – FOTOFÓRUM 35 – Ružomberok, 2002
 Honorable mention of the Association of Slovak Photographers 2002 for a photo-story – Ružomberok
 2nd place at the regional round of AMFO and DIAFOTO 2002 – Pezinok
 1st prize at the Czecho-Slovak competition of travel photography AMADEUS – Prague, Czech Republic in 2002
 1st prize at the Czecho-Slovak competition of travel photography AMADEUS – Prague, Czech Republic in 2003
 2nd place at the regional round of AMFO and DIAFOTO 2004 – Pezinok
 1st place at the HORY a MESTO festival, the People and Culture category, 2004 – Bratislava
 5th place in a WATT 2004 photo competition, in the "Story" category – Bratislava
 Main prize at the HORY a MESTO festival for a set of portraits in 2006
 1st place at the HORY a MESTO festival, the People and Culture category, 2008 – Bratislava
 Honourable mention of the Association of Slovak Photographers for Digital Macrophotography – detail, Ružomberok 2011
 Award for documentary photo "Documentary Award of The Humanity Photo Awards 2011" on the occasion of the opening of exhibition "Memories of Mankind VII" for portfolio "Voodoo in Benin" in Kunming, China, under the auspices of UNESCO, held in 2011.
 Gold Medal in the photograph competition 12th Special Themes Circuit Trierenberg in Emotions – Human Relations Theme in Austria in 2013
 Honourable Mention by Photo Association of Serbia at 2nd International Salon of Photography FKNS – Grand Prix 2013 in Novi Sad, Serbia
 Highly Commended award at 9th Swansea Digital International organized by Swansea Camera Club in Swansea, UK, in 2013
 Bronze Medal at BUFSAD Photo Contest in Bursa, Turkey, in 2014 
 Honorary Mention awarded by The Royal Photographic Society – STROM 2015—Ružomberok
 2 prizes for 2 series of documentary photography " Performance Award of The Humanity Photo Awards 2015" for portfolio "Bungee jumping of Pentecost Island" and "Small and Big Nambas Tribe" in Beijing, China, under the auspices of UNESCO in 2015
 The prize of the Association of Slovak Photographers in the category Colours of the Earth – Ružomberok 2016
2005: AZSF title – The Author of the Association of Slovak Photographers – in Ružomberok, and the AFIAP title – Artiste FIAP – The International Federation of Photographic Art – in Belgium. 
2007: Photograph of the year 2007 in the Slovak Republic.
2009: EFIAP – Excellence de la Fédération Internationale de l´Art Photographique (Excellence of the International Federation of Photographic Art).
 In 2015 she was awarded the title 'Personality of Bratislava – Ruzinov borough' by its mayor Dusan Pekar to commemorate the 25th anniversary of the city district existence.

Collections
Vaculíková´s EFIAP and AZSF photographs can be found in the collections of The International Photography Museum in Cerdanyol, Spain, the World Folklore Photo Museum(HPA), Beijing, China, Photoforum Ružomberok, Slovakia, Golden Foundation of the ASPRužomberok, Slovakia and in the collection of the gallery FotoGaléria Nova in Košice.

Solo exhibitions
 1999 Vietnam and Cambodia in the eyes of women, Hotel Kyjev, Bratislava, Slovakia
 2000 People from faraway countries, Atrium Poštova banka, Bratislava, Slovakia
 2001 People from faraway countries, The House of Art, Pieštany, Slovakia
 2002 People from faraway countries, Hotel Kyjev, Bratislava, Slovakia
 2005 People from faraway countries, Hotel Bratislava, Bratislava, Slovakia
 2007 The World of People, Bratislava castle, Bratislava, Slovakia
 2007 The World of People, The House of Art, Pieštany, Slovakia
 2008 The World of People, Kültür Merkezi, Istanbul, Turkey
 2008 The World of People, FotoGalery Nova, Košice, Slovakia
 2008 The World of People, Vuotalo Cultural Center, Helsinki, Finland
 2009 The World of People, Regional library of central Finland, Jyväskylä, Finland
 2009 The World of People, Tashkent House of Photography, Tashkent, Uzbekistan
 2015 The World of People, Travel Gallery, Bratislava, Slovensko

Sources

References

External links
 
 http://www.ta3.com/clanok/1033700/rozhovor-s-t-pauhofovou-cestopis-tulanie-svetom-svadba-v-divadle-o-premierach-v-cinohre-snd.html
 http://zena.sme.sk/c/5437406/silvia-vaculikova-rada-zachytavam-obycajnych-ludi.html
 http://2015.hpa.org.cn/en/NewsPage.aspx?nid=395

Slovak photographers
Slovak women photographers
1967 births
Living people
People from Trnava
AFIAP